Highway 227 (AR 227, Ark. 227, and Hwy. 227) is a designation for two north–south state highways in Garland County, Arkansas. One segment of  runs north from US Highway 70 (US 70) to US 270. A second route of  begins at US 270 at Piney and runs north to Lake Ouachita State Park. Both routes are maintained by the Arkansas Department of Transportation (ARDOT).

Route description

US 70 to US 270

Highway 227 begins at US 70 west of Hot Springs. The highway winds north through rolling hills through the community of Sunshine before terminating at US 270 west of Royal.

Piney to Lake Ouachita State Park
Highway 227 begins at US 270 west of Hot Springs at Piney near Lake Hamilton. The route runs north through Hawes and Mountain Pine before intersecting with Highway 192. Following this intersection, the route enters the Ouachita National Forest and Lake Ouachita State Park. The highway terminates at Crawdad Island Rd/Mountain Pine Rd (state park roads) near the visitor's center.

History
Highway 227 was created from US 270 to Lake Ouachita State Park by the Arkansas State Highway Commission (ASHC) on July 10, 1957. The second segment was created on July 28, 1965.

Major intersections

See also

References

Sources

External links

227
Transportation in Garland County, Arkansas